A constitutional referendum was held in the Northern Mariana Islands on 6 March 1977. The new constitution was approved by 93% of voters and came into force on 9 January 1978.

Background
A Constitutional Assembly had been elected and drafted the new constitution between 18 October until 5 December 1976.

Results

References

Northern Mariana
1977 in the Northern Mariana Islands
Constitutional referendums in the Northern Mariana Islands
1977
1977